Be My Guest is an early Australian television series, which aired weekly on Melbourne station HSV-7 from 30 January 1957 to 24 April 1957. Episodes were 15 minutes in duration (following a 15-minute newscast), and hosted by Eric Pearce. It was likely an interview series, but little is known about it, and it is not known if any kinescope recordings were made of it. However, despite its obscurity, it is notable as an early example of Australian-produced television content.

The series aired at 7:15PM on Wednesdays. The series aired against U.S. series The Adventures of Wild Bill Hickok on GTV-9 and U.S. series The Life of Riley (the second version, starring William Bendix) on ABV-2.

References

External links

Seven Network original programming
1957 Australian television series debuts
1957 Australian television series endings
Australian non-fiction television series
Black-and-white Australian television shows
Australian live television series
Australian television talk shows